

History 
The American Chamber of Commerce in Albania was formed as an Albanian not-for-profit in August 2000.  The American Chamber of Commerce in Albania is a private business promotion and development organization, which tries to increase trade between the United States and Albania.

Membership 
AmCham Albania's membership currently comprises over 200 companies. Members include some of the world's biggest brands and leading multinationals from across all industries and business sectors. From 2019 the president of AmCham Albania is Enio Jaco.

Committees 
 CEO's Forum
 Intellectual Property Rights
 Tax and Legal
 Women in Business
 Corporate Social Responsibility

Contact Information 

    American Chamber of Commerce in Albania
    Rr. Ibrahim Rugova, Sky Tower, kati 11 Ap 3
    1000 Tirana, Albania
    www.amcham.com.al

Affiliate organizations
 United States Chamber of Commerce
 American Chamber of Commerce to the European Union

Sources
AmCham Albania website * 

Albanian-American history 
American Chambers of commerce